Robert Cowan (born September 5, 1983) is a Canadian former professional ice hockey defenceman.

Early life 
Cowan was born in Calgary. He attended Robert Morris University and played with the Robert Morris Colonials, where he captained the NCAA college hockey team from 2004 to 2008, scoring one goal and 20 assists for 21 points, while earning 197 penalty minutes, in 123 games played.

Career 
Cowan played three years of professional hockey, including 133 regular season and 21 playoff games played with the Port Huron Icehawks of the International Hockey League, and 66 regular season games and three playoff games played with the Rio Grande Valley Killer Bees of the Central Hockey League.

References

External links

1983 births
Living people
Canadian ice hockey defencemen
Olds Grizzlys players
Port Huron Icehawks players
Rio Grande Valley Killer Bees players
Robert Morris Colonials men's ice hockey players
Ice hockey people from Calgary